Alpheus novaezealandiae is a species of shrimp in the family Alpheidae, found in Australasia.

References

Alpheidae
Crustaceans described in 1876
Taxa named by Edward J. Miers
Crustaceans of the Pacific Ocean